Pseudophilautus silus, known as pug-nosed shrub frog is a species of frogs in the family Rhacophoridae. It is endemic to southern Sri Lanka and known from the both sides of the Horton Plains (near Agarapatana and Haputale).

Its natural habitats are closed-canopy forests but it also occurs in open, anthropogenic habitats. It is an uncommon species threatened by the encroachment of tea plantations, firewood collection, expanding human settlements, and agro-chemical pollution.

References

silus
Endemic fauna of Sri Lanka
Frogs of Sri Lanka
Taxa named by Rohan Pethiyagoda
Amphibians described in 2005
Taxonomy articles created by Polbot